Yehud-Monosson is a city formed by the joint municipality of the town of Yehud and the neighboring communal settlement of Neve Monosson in central Israel.

History
Within a local authority merger program initiated by the Israeli Ministry of the Interior in 2003, the Municipality of Yehud was merged with the Local Council of Neve Monosson. The logo is inscribed with Biblical words from Genesis 49:8: "Judah, your brothers will praise you; your hand will be on the neck of your enemies."

Under the terms of the merger, Neve Monosson was left with a high level of communal autonomy under the elected Neve Monosson Local Administration (minhelet mekomit) which was granted municipal status as an autonomous borough (va'ad rova ironi) by the Interior Minister in 2005 within the implementation of the merger plan.

Notable people
Yonit Naaman, essayist, editor, and literary researcher
Golan Pollack (born 1991), Olympic judoka
Shlomi Shabat, vocalist

References

External links
Official website
 

Cities in Israel
Cities in Central District (Israel)
2003 establishments in Israel
Populated places established in 2003